Underemployed may refer to:

 A person subject to underemployment.
 Underemployed (TV series), a comedy-drama television series that airs on MTV.